Janigog is a census village in Nalbari district, Assam, India. As per the 2011 Census of India, Janigog has a total population of 3,795 people including 1,991 males and 1,804 females.

Janigog has a history of being militancy affected area.

References 

Villages in Nalbari district